In mathematics, a local martingale is a type of stochastic process, satisfying the localized version of the martingale property. Every martingale is a local martingale; every bounded local martingale is a martingale; in particular, every local martingale that is bounded from below is a supermartingale, and every local martingale that is bounded from above is a submartingale; however, in general a local martingale is not a martingale, because its expectation can be distorted by large values of small probability. In particular, a driftless diffusion process is a local martingale, but not necessarily a martingale.

Local martingales are essential in stochastic analysis (see Itō calculus, semimartingale, and Girsanov theorem).

Definition

Then  is called an -local martingale if there exists a sequence of -stopping times  such that
 the  diverge almost surely: ;
 the stopped process  is an -martingale for every .

Examples

Example 1
Let Wt be the Wiener process and T = min{ t : Wt = −1 } the time of first hit of −1. The stopped process Wmin{ t, T } is a martingale; its expectation is 0 at all times, nevertheless its limit (as t → ∞) is equal to −1 almost surely (a kind of gambler's ruin). A time change leads to a process

 

The process  is continuous almost surely; nevertheless, its expectation is discontinuous,

 

This process is not a martingale. However, it is a local martingale. A localizing sequence may be chosen as  if there is such t, otherwise . This sequence diverges almost surely, since  for all k large enough (namely, for all k that exceed the maximal value of the process X). The process stopped at τk is a martingale.

Example 2
Let Wt be the Wiener process and ƒ a measurable function such that  Then the following process is a martingale:
 
here
 
 
where
 
The process  is continuous almost surely (since  almost surely), nevertheless, its expectation is discontinuous,
 
This process is not a martingale. However, it is a local martingale. A localizing sequence may be chosen as

Example 3
Let  be the complex-valued Wiener process, and
 
The process  is continuous almost surely (since  does not hit 1, almost surely), and is a local martingale, since the function  is harmonic (on the complex plane without the point 1). A localizing sequence may be chosen as  Nevertheless, the expectation of this process is non-constant; moreover,
    as 

Martingales via local martingales 
Let  be a local martingale. In order to prove that it is a martingale it is sufficient to prove that  in L1 (as ) for every t, that is,  here  is the stopped process. The given relation  implies that  almost surely. The dominated convergence theorem ensures the convergence in L1 provided that
     for every t.
Thus, Condition (*) is sufficient for a local martingale  being a martingale. A stronger condition
     for every t
is also sufficient.

Caution. The weaker condition
     for every t
is not sufficient. Moreover, the condition
 
is still not sufficient; for a counterexample see Example 3 above.

A special case:
 
The process  is a local martingale if and only if f satisfies the PDE
 
However, this PDE itself does not ensure that  is a martingale. In order to apply (**) the following condition on f is sufficient: for every  and t there exists  such that
 
for all  and

Technical details

References

 

Martingale theory